The Afghan cricket team toured Scotland from 11 to 17 August 2010. The tour consisted of one Intercontinental Cup Match and two One Day Internationals (ODIs).

Intercontinental Cup Match

ODI series

1st ODI

2nd ODI

References

External links

2010 in Afghan cricket
2010 in Scottish cricket
Afghan cricket tours of Scotland
International cricket competitions in 2010
Afghanistan 2010